Laura Elena Estrada Rodríguez (born 14 September 1952) is a Mexican politician from the National Action Party. From 2009 to 2012 she served as Deputy of the LXI Legislature of the Mexican Congress representing Durango, and previously served in the Congress of Durango.

References

1952 births
Living people
Politicians from Guanajuato
People from León, Guanajuato
Women members of the Chamber of Deputies (Mexico)
National Action Party (Mexico) politicians
21st-century Mexican politicians
21st-century Mexican women politicians
Members of the Congress of Durango
Deputies of the LXI Legislature of Mexico
Members of the Chamber of Deputies (Mexico) for Durango